Lavigeria is a genus of tropical freshwater snails with a gill and an operculum, aquatic gastropod molluscs in the family Paludomidae.

All species are restricted to Lake Tanganyika in Africa, and share in common a strong heavy shell with sculpture more characteristic of marine gastropods.

Species
Species within genus Lavigeria include:
 Lavigeria coronata Bourguignat, 1888
 Lavigeria grandis (Smith, 1881)
 Lavigeria nassa (Woodward, 1859)
 Lavigeria paucicostata (Bourguignat, 1888)

References

External links

Paludomidae
Taxonomy articles created by Polbot
Snails of Lake Tanganyika